Cardiobacterium is a Gram-negative bacillus (rod-shaped) bacterium  commonly grouped with other bacteria into the HACEK group. Species of Cardiobacterium include Cardiobacterium hominis and Cardiobacterium valvarum.

References

External links

Gram-negative bacteria
Gammaproteobacteria